Kessar is a trade name for the drug tamoxifen.
It may also refer to:
Naveeta Kessar, producer of Indian comedy television series Bajega Band Baaja
Radha Kessar, Indian mathematician
Satinder Vir Kessar (born 1932), Indian chemist
Yisrael Kessar (born 1931), Israeli politician